Brésil was the first spherical balloon made for Alberto Santos Dumont, in which, at the age of 25, he introduced several innovations in aeronautics and made more than 200 flights.

History

Origin
After seven years living in Paris and having already performed several ascents in other balloons, Santos Dumont decided to develop his own aircraft to gain experience, as it would be more economical than renting balloons from other builders.

Before flying in Brésil, Henri Lachambre's team let Santos Dumont make ascents in both France and Belgium as a way of gaining experience.

Development
One of Santos Dumont's main innovations in this aircraft was the use of Japanese silk for the envelope: Japanese silk, despite having 70% of the resistance per unit area of Chinese silk, still had 70% more resistance than necessary. However, the other balloonists feared that the delicacy of the material would cause tears in flight, and Santos Dumont only began to trust the material after several laboratory tests.

Everything involved was kept as small as possible, even though there was no experience with such a tiny balloon. However, Santos Dumont had to study everything that had been accomplished so far to have confidence in the project. Instead of an anchor, he used a small  harpoon. His critics said the balloon would have no stability, nor any success.

Use and legacy
Its first flight took place on 4 July 1898, in the Jardin d´Acclimatation. Santos Dumont described that the balloon "...very maneuverable in the air and very smooth." and that it would not be wrong to say that he carried it in his briefcase. The aeronaut also described that the balloon was "...beautiful in its transparency, like a big soap bubble."

Its use in over 200 flights made Santos Dumont one of the best aeronauts in France and gave him the due flight experience that resulted in the development of other balloons and his airships, as well as attracting attention from other inventors and the European press. The performance of its first two models, "Brésil" and "Amérique", impressed experienced balloonists. Its first airship, the "Nº1", had its first test run on September 18, 1898, three and a half months after the first flight of the "Brésil".

 describes that because of his innovations in developing a balloon of reduced size and cost, Santos Dumont "...would have made a great contribution to aeronautics," even if he had only created the Brésil.

See also
List of Santos-Dumont aircraft

References

Bibliography

 

 

Additional reading

1898 in France
Santos-Dumont aircraft
Individual balloons (aircraft)